Bernd Wallet serves as the 84th Archbishop of Utrecht of the Old Catholic Church of the Netherlands. Elected on 15 February 2020, he was consecrated on 18 September 2021, after two delays due to the COVID-19 pandemic.

Life and career
The son of a pastor of the Dutch Reformed Church, Wallet converted to Old Catholicism and completed his theological studies at the University of Hull in 2005 and from the Old Catholic Seminary in Amersfoort in 2006. He was ordained a deacon in 2006 by Archbishop John Sentamu of the Anglican Diocese of York. One year later, he was ordained a priest by Archbishop Joris Vercammen at St. Gertrude Cathedral in Utrecht.

From 2007 to 2010, Wallet served as assistant curate in Northallerton, in the Diocese of York. Upon his return to the Netherlands, he served as personal assistant to Archbishop Vercammen, responsible for external relations with other Old Catholic Churches of the Union of Utrecht and the Anglican Church.

Wallet served as pastor of St. Gertrude Cathedral in Utrecht from 2015 to 2020. On 15 February 2020, he was elected Archbishop of Utrecht by the Cathedral Chapter of Utrecht. At that time, he shared, "I want to challenge our parishes to be open houses for those in their areas...We must continue to be open to society and testify with joy to the hope that is in us."

His episcopal consecration was first scheduled for 21 June, but postponed because of the COVID-19 pandemic. On 23 October 2020, the Metropolitan Chapter of Utrecht announced that the consecration, which had been scheduled for 7 November 2020 (the Feast of St Willibrord, the first bishop of Utrecht), had to be cancelled a second time. He was eventually consecrated and enthroned on 18 September 2021 in the Lebuïnuskerk in Deventer by Old Catholic bishop Dirk Schoon; the consecration was attended by bishops of the Church of England, the Episcopal Church, and the Church of Sweden, alongside representatives of the Roman Catholic Church, the Protestant Church of the Netherlands and the Ecumenical Patriarchate of Constantinople.

Wallet is married and has children.

References

1971 births
Living people
Dutch Old Catholics
Dutch Old Catholic bishops
People from Middelburg, Zeeland